Marjadwa is a village in West Champaran district in the Indian state of Bihar.

Demographics 
As of 2011 India census,Census 2011

References 

Villages in West Champaran district